Commodore John Fairbairn (12 March 1912 – March 1984) was a South African Naval officer.

Fairbairn was born in Plumstead, Cape Town. After being educated at Diocesan College in Rondebosch, he started working at the Standard Bank in 1930. He joined the Royal Navy Volunteer Reserve (RNVR) on 1 July 1929 on a part-time basis while still working at the bank until the start of World War II, when he signed up to the South African Navy full-time on 4 September 1939 and was promoted to lieutenant on 12 November the same year.

On 1 May 1946, he joined the SA Navy Permanent Force and was given the rank of lieutenant-commander. On 4 January 1948 while in command of the  HMSAS Transvaal, the Marion and Prince Edward islands were annexed from Great Britain. He commanded the  SAS President Steyn before being appointed naval officer in charge (NoiC) of the Simon's Town Naval Base.

Fairbairn retired in 1972 and died in Cape Town in March 1984.

References

1912 births
1984 deaths
Alumni of Diocesan College, Cape Town
South African admirals
Royal Naval Volunteer Reserve personnel
South African military personnel of World War II